This is a list of airports in British Columbia. It includes all Nav Canada certified and registered water and land airports, aerodromes and heliports in the Canadian province of British Columbia.


List of airports and heliports
The list is sorted by the name of the community served; click the sort buttons in the table header to switch listing order.

Defunct airports

See also

 List of airports in Campbell River area
 List of airports in the Gulf Islands
 List of airports in the Lower Mainland
 List of airports in the Okanagan
 List of airports in the Prince Rupert area
 List of airports on Vancouver Island
 List of airports in Greater Victoria

References 

 
British Columbia
Airports